Pulippunam is strategically located. It is one of the most fertile lands of Tamil Nadu and has the climatic conditions of Kerala. It has a National Highway connecting the capital of Kerala, Trivandrum, with the southernmost tip of India, Kanyakumari district.

Transport
Pulippunam is well connected to Chennai, Mumbai, Bangalore by rail service from Palliyadi Railway station and also bus service to all over Tamil Nadu.

References

Cities and towns in Kanyakumari district